Žarko Bulajić (22 July 1922 in Vilusi, Nikšić, Montenegro – 1 January 2009) was the President of the Executive Council of the Socialist Republic of Montenegro from 7 October 1969 to 6 May 1974.

References

1922 births
2009 deaths
Politicians from Nikšić
League of Communists of Montenegro politicians
Montenegrin communists